Shirebrook railway station serves the town of Shirebrook in Derbyshire, England. The station is on the Robin Hood Line, 21½ miles (35 km) north of Nottingham towards Worksop.

History
The line and the station were built by the Midland Railway. It was opened for goods traffic in April 1875 and for passenger traffic on 1 June 1875 when the Midland Railway built a  branch line from Mansfield to Worksop. The station was designed by the Midland Railway company architect John Holloway Sanders.

In 1951, the station was renamed "Shirebrook West" despite being on the eastern edge of the village. This was to "avoid confusion" with three other stations:
  built by the LD&ECR in 1897. Despite its name, Shirebrook North was not actually in Shirebrook, but in nearby Langwith Junction.
  built by the GNR on their line from Langwith Junction to  via . This line used to pass through the middle of Shirebrook by a massive embankment, cutting the village in two. Shirebrook South actually was in southern Shirebrook.
 Shirebrook Colliery (later renamed Shirebrook Colliery Sidings) for colliery workmen's trains only.

Shirebrook South closed to regular passenger services in 1931, but excursions continued to call at least until 1957. Shirebrook North closed to regular passenger services in 1955, but excursions continued to call until 1964. Shirebrook Colliery Sidings closed by June 1954.

Station masters
H. Woods 1875 - 1906
William Dean 1906 - 1920 (formerly station master at Barrow on Soar, afterwards station master at Barrow Hill and Staveley Works, and Staveley Town and Whittington)
Charles Garner 1920 - 1930 (afterwards station master at Ilkley)
Henry Alfred Breathwaite ca. 1953

Branch lines
Two branch lines are plainly visible veering off north of the bridge at the north end of Shirebrook station.

The double tracks branching off eastwards (i.e. to the right as viewed from the station) to the side of the signalbox joined the LD&ECR's one-time main line to Lincoln, next stop . The branch only ever carried a regular passenger service for a few years in Edwardian times. It did, however, carry Summer holiday trains such as the Summer Saturdays Radford to Skegness in at least 1963. The branch's main purpose was always freight traffic, with coal being overwhelmingly dominant.

In 2013 the line gives access to UK Coal's Thoresby Colliery and to the High Marnham Test Track.

There is some hope of reopening the line as a branch off the Robin Hood Line and reopening , Edwinstowe and Ollerton stations, providing an hourly service to Mansfield and Nottingham.

The single line veering off westwards (to the left as viewed from the station) was removed in the 1940s and relaid in 1974. It used to have a matching second track coming down on the other side of the main lines, behind the signalbox as viewed from the station, but that was not reinstated.

The reinstated single line serves W H Davis's wagon works in Langwith Junction.

Finally, up to 1974 the next station north from Shirebrook on what is now the Robin Hood Line was not  but simply "". That station was at Langwith Maltings. In the 1964-1998 closure period it was demolished. As a new station would have to be built at Langwith when the Robin Hood Line was to be reopened it was decided that the community would be better served by a station at Nether Langwith/Whaley Thorns than at the old station site.

Services
All services at Shirebrook are operated by East Midlands Railway.

There is currently no Sunday service at the station since the previous service of four trains per day was withdrawn in 2011. Sunday services at the station are due to recommence at the station during the life of the East Midlands franchise.

References

Sources

Other reading

External links

The station on an Edwardian 6" OS map, via National Library of Scotland
The station on a navigable 1947 OS Map, via npe Maps
The station, line and mileages, via Railway Mileages

Railway stations in Derbyshire
DfT Category F1 stations
Former Midland Railway stations
Railway stations in Great Britain opened in 1875
Railway stations in Great Britain closed in 1964
Railway stations in Great Britain opened in 1998
Railway stations served by East Midlands Railway
Reopened railway stations in Great Britain
Beeching closures in England
John Holloway Sanders railway stations
Shirebrook